Dmitry Alexandrovich Borovikov also known as «Kislyi» (Sour) (9 June 1984 – 18 May 2006) — was a Russian neo-Nazi and neo-Pagan, the organizer of two extremist groups "Mad Crowd" and "Combat Terrorist Organization" (Boevaya Terroristicheskaya Organizaciya, BTO). He died from a wound when detained by operatives of the 18th (political) department of the UBOP on May 18, 2006.

Biography 
Dmitry Borovikov was born in Leningrad in the russian family of an employee of the criminal investigation department of the Admiralty police Department. He lived in house 4 in Boytsov Lane. After graduation, he entered the law Faculty of the Regional University, where he studied for 2.5 years.

In the period from 1999 to 2006, Dmitry Borovikov was detained several times by law enforcement agencies on suspicion of attacks on people of non-European appearance. So, he and his friend named Yan were detained on charges of attacking a Chinese man who was stabbed from behind. But in the end, Yan was the only one convicted.

Schultz-88 
Dmitry met Dmitry Bobrov ("Schultz") as a 16-year-old teenager. For his love of heavy music and the band "Kiss", Borovikov received the nickname "Kislyi", to which he subscribed in online publications. In the summer of 2001, Dmitry Borovikov joined Schultz-88, where he became the "right hand" of the leader. Borovikov was at the origins of "Schultz-88" and took an active part in all the significant actions of 2001-2002. Also while in "Schultz-88", Kislyi was actively engaged in propaganda.

Many articles in the magazines «Made in St. Petersburg» and «Гнев Перуна» (The Wrath of Perun), such as «Жёлтая угроза» (The Yellow Threat), «Аргументы и факты» (Arguments and facts), «Советы начинающим штурмовикам» (Tips for novice stormtroopers), «Перунов день» (Perun's Day), «Стрижено? Нет, брито!» (Cut? No, shaved!) and many others belonged to him. The publication of the magazine «Гнев Перуна #5» was largely due to Borovikov. He published his own magazine "Straight Edge - A Storm of Pure Blood". In this group, Borovikov met , then their views with Schultz diverged, and they left Schultz-88.

Mad Crowd 
In 2002, Borovikov is at the origins of the Mad Crowd Firm group. The main difference of the new group was the emphasis on a healthy lifestyle, sympathy for the football movement and the desire to find foreign Nazis.

In his magazine «Гнев Перуна», Kislyi once wrote: "We don't need you, but your children. It is from them that we will raise a new race. Because you can't be changed anymore. TV, family, poor entertainment, fashionable clothes, a clogged refrigerator... if this is all that white people are interested in today, then what kind of white people are they? They are meat and garbage. The white race must be created from scratch".

From hooliganism to terror 

By 2003, Borovikov realized that to achieve his goals, it was not enough to flaunt skinhead paraphernalia, a thorough conspiracy was needed. There were strict conditions, a person joining their new group must meet three criteria:
 Racism
 Paganism
 Health promotion

Interest in football at this stage cools down, there is an installation not for beating, but for killing. Journalists dubbed this group "Combat Terrorist Organization" (BTO). In total, the BTO consisted of 10 people. According to the employees of the 18th department of the Department of Internal Affairs, «at first, there were six of them, then nine, and at the end it seems to be eleven people. But only the managers themselves knew exactly how much. At Schultz and in "Mad Crowd", everyone bragged about their exploits right and left. By and large, this is where they all sat down. And here the conspiracy was so tough that it is impossible to get to the truth even now».

Bloody 2004
Borovikov was detained in 2004 in the high-profile case of the "Tajik girl" Khursheda Sultonova, who was killed on February 9 near his home. Borovikov was detained three hours after the murder, but the traces of blood found on his clothes were thoroughly washed with gasoline, and therefore it was not possible to identify what was found with the blood of the deceased. It was suggested that Borovikov managed to evade responsibility, thanks to the connections of his father, a police officer.

On June 7, Borovikov organized the execution of two of his former associates Rostislav Hoffman and Alexey Golovchenko in the forest near the village of Zahodskoye in the Vyborg district. They were wounded with a crossbow and finished off with knives. The direct perpetrators of the murder were Alexey Voevodin, Roman Orlov and Artem Prokhorenko.

On June 19, the scientist Nikolai Girenko was killed by Borovikov's associates Andrey Kostrachenkov and Artem Prokhorenko. Presumably, Dmitry was related to this crime, because he spoke unflatteringly about this expert:

In 2004, a criminal case was opened against "Mad Crowd". Then almost all the members of the group were arrested, except Dmitry Borovikov and Ruslan Melnik. They were accused of creating an "extremist community". The investigation was able to prove only a few episodes of attacks.

In hiding 
Since April 25, 2005 Borovikov was put on the international wanted list for extremism with the note "especially dangerous" and "may actively resist during detention". While on the run, Borovikov and other gang members, in order to support their financial situation, began to engage in robberies of post offices, and articles were added to the criminal case for robberies on post offices, banditry, robberies, kidnappings. At this time, magazines were released, in the creation of which Dmitry directly participated: "Smell of Hatred","Kill or be killed","Grin". On December 18, Dmitry Borovikov had a daughter, Anna Borovikova, born.

On April 7, 2006, Borovikov organized the murder of Senegalese Samba Lampsar (1978-2006), a 5th-year student of the Bonch-Bruevich State University, one of the leaders of the "African Unity", who was returning from the "Apollo" nightclub (12 Izmailovsky Avenue). The murder was directly committed by Andrey Malyugin near the house 17 on the 5th Krasnoarmeyskaya Street. The murder weapon was a pump-action shotgun, which was left at the crime scene. A swastika and the phrases «skinhead weapon» and «death to Negroes» were scrawled on the butt of the gun.

Death 
On May 18, 2006, Dmitry was sitting in the courtyard with a friend at the house No. 23 on Planernaya Street. When he saw that a group of people in civilian clothes (operatives) were approaching him, he realized that law enforcement officials had decided to detain him. There are several versions of the further development of events: according to one, Borovikov tried to escape; according to another, Borovikov attacked police officers with a knife. After trying to avoid arrest, the operatives shot at him (a warning shot was fired before that), as a result of which Borovikov fell to the ground, bleeding. Borovikov died almost immediately after the ambulance arrived.

Borovikov was buried in the Northern Cemetery without a funeral service, since he was a neo-pagan. About 20 people gathered at the funeral ceremony. Borovikov's grave became a place of pilgrimage for Russian neo-Nazis.

Beliefs 
Borovikov considered himself to be a "Skin-movement" and professed the ideas of WP (White Power). The government in Russia, in his opinion, is a branch of ZOG. He calls his native St. Petersburg Nevograd, and calls the representatives of "colored" the main enemies: "khachiks" (russian ethnic slur for the native peoples of the South Caucasus) and "churkas" (russian ethnic slur for the native peoples of Central Asia), who mix with "Russian stupid women" to produce mestizos. Direct action in the form of street attacks on "non-russians", in his opinion, contributes to the purification of the people from non-racial elements and the transformation of the Russian Federation into "White Rus".

See also 
 Combat Terrorist Organization

References 

21st-century Russian criminals
Russian neo-Nazis
Terrorism in Russia

1984 births
2006 deaths
Russian people who died in prison custody
People shot dead by law enforcement officers in Russia
Criminals from Saint Petersburg
Russian modern pagans